The Treaty of Malmö, signed on 1 September 1524, ended the Swedish War of Liberation. Denmark-Norway acknowledged the independent status of Sweden, which in turn renounced claims to Scania and Blekinge. 

The difficult question of the control of Gotland was deferred to later occasion, to be refereed by a committee of representatives from various Hanseatic League cities. Swedish troops were to continue military occupation of Ranrike until the issue was resolved. By 1532, no agreement had been reached, and Ranrike was returned to Denmark-Norway in exchange for 1,200 guilders.

See also
List of treaties

References

Other sources
Gary Dean Peterson (2014) Warrior Kings of Sweden: The Rise of an Empire in the Sixteenth and Seventeenth Centuries (McFarland)

External links
Swedish War of Liberation, 1521-1523 

Malmo
Malmo
Malmo
History of Lübeck
Hanseatic League
Malmo
1524 in Denmark
1524 in Norway
1524 in Sweden
Swedish War of Liberation
1524 treaties